Space Needle was an American experimental rock band founded in Providence, Rhode Island, who were active from 1994 to 1997. The group was founded by Jud Ehrbar and Jeff Gatland, who made their initial recordings on four track tape. Anders Parker joined the group after the release of their 1995 debut Voyager.

Band members
 Jud Ehrbar - drums, vocals, keyboards, guitars, percussion
 Jeff Gatland - guitars, percussion
 Anders Parker - guitars, vocals, drums, percussion

Appearance in other media
"Never Lonely Alone" from the album "The Moray Eels Eat The Space Needle" appears in Academy Award winning filmmaker Steven Okazaki's documentary Black Tar Heroin: The Dark End of the Street.
"Never Lonely Alone" was featured in the Veronica Mars season 3 episode, "Charlie Don't Surf".

Discography

Studio albums
 Voyager (1995)
 The Moray Eels Eat The Space Needle (1997)

EPs
 Space Needle

Singles
 Sun Doesn't Love Me b/w Sugar Mountain 7"
 Panic Delaney b/w Outta My Face 7" (1996)

Compilations
Full House: Spring '96 (Various artists, 1996)
Recordings 1994-1997 (2006)

References

External links
 Space Needle at Eeniemeenie.com

Rock music groups from Rhode Island
American experimental rock groups
Indie rock musical groups from Rhode Island
Musical groups established in 1994
Musical groups disestablished in 1997
American musical trios
1994 establishments in Rhode Island